Sieniawka  is a village in the administrative district of Gmina Bogatynia, within Zgorzelec County, Lower Silesian Voivodeship, in south-western Poland, close to the Czech and German borders.

In the village there are two historic churches: the Immaculate Conception church and the Saint John the Baptist church. Also a hospital for the mentally ill is located in Sieniawka.

During World War II, in 1944–1945, the Germans operated the FAL Zittau subcamp of the Gross-Rosen concentration camp in the village, whose prisoners were Jews, initially only women, and from February 1945 also men.

Gallery

References

Sieniawka